Liggins may refer to:

 Liggins, a surname
 Liggins Institute, University of Auckland